Kathleen Marie Hooker (born November 18, 1981) is an American soccer forward who last played for Sky Blue FC of Women's Professional Soccer.

References

External links
 Women's Professional Soccer player profile
 WUSA player profile
 Iowa State player profile
 Denver player profile
 Denver coaching profile

1981 births
Living people
Women's association football forwards
NJ/NY Gotham FC players
Los Angeles Sol players
Iowa State Cyclones women's soccer players
Denver Pioneers women's soccer players
USL W-League (1995–2015) players
American women's soccer players
Denver Diamonds players
Women's Premier Soccer League players
Women's Professional Soccer players
Atlanta Beat (WUSA) players
San Jose CyberRays players
Women's United Soccer Association players